The 1988 NAIA men's basketball tournament was held in March at Kemper Arena in Kansas City, Missouri. The 51st annual NAIA basketball tournament featured 32 teams playing in a single-elimination format. The last time 3rd and 4th decided on the court.

Awards and honors
Leading scorers: Reginald Henderson Rodney Johns
Leading rebounder:
Player of the Year: est. 1994.

Bracket

  * denotes overtime.

See also
1988 NCAA Division I men's basketball tournament
1988 NCAA Division II men's basketball tournament
1988 NCAA Division III men's basketball tournament
1988 NAIA women's basketball tournament

References

NAIA Men's Basketball Championship
Tournament
NAIA men's basketball tournament
NAIA men's basketball tournament
College basketball tournaments in Missouri
Basketball competitions in Kansas City, Missouri